The following lists events that happened during 1984 in Sri Lanka.

Incumbents
 President – J. R. Jayewardene
 Prime Minister – Ranasinghe Premadasa
 Chief Justice – Neville Samarakoon then Suppiah Sharvananda

Events
 On 28 January 1984, a bomb exploded in the Hotel Lanka Oberoi in Colombo. One employee was killed.
 The Mannar massacre takes place in 1984 claiming the lives of roughly 107-150 ethnic tamils. The attack was a response to an incident when three Army jeeps hit a land mine, killing one soldier.

Notes

a.  Gunaratna, Rohan. (1998). Pg.353, Sri Lanka's Ethnic Crisis and National Security, Colombo: South Asian Network on Conflict Research.

References